Joseph Mazilier (1 March 1801 in Marseilles – 19 May 1868 in Paris) was a 19th-century French dancer, balletmaster and choreographer. He was born as Giulio Mazarini.  He was most noted for his ballets Paquita (1844) and Le Corsaire (1856). He created the role of James in La Sylphide with Marie Taglioni. Marie Guy-Stéphan debuted in Aelia et Mysis at the Paris Opéra when she moved in 1853 to Paris.

Ballets
La Gypsy (1839)
La Vendetta (1839)
Le Diable Amoureux (1840)
Lady Henrietta, or the Servant of Greenwich (Lady Henriette, ou la Servante de Greenwich) (1944)
Le Diable à Quatre (1845)
Paquita (1846)
Betty (1846)
Griseldis, ou les Cinq sens (1848)
Vert-vert (Green-Green) (1851)
Orfa (1852)
Aelia et Mysis, ou l'Atellane (1853)
Jovita, ou les Boucaniers (1853)
La Fonti (1855)
Le Corsaire (1856)
Les Elfes (1856)
Marco Spada ou La Fille du Bandit (1857)
Une fête au port (1867)

Roles
James in La Sylphide by Filippo Taglioni in 1832
Fernando in La Tempête by Jean Coralli in 1834
Stenio in La Gypsy in 1839

Other ballet posts
Master of the Paris Opera Ballet from 1839 until 1851.
Master of the Saint Petersburg Ballet from 1851 until 1852
Master of the Paris Opera Ballet from 1852 until 1857.
Master of the Lyon Ballet from 1862 until 1866
Master of ballet at the Théâtre royal de la Monnaie in Brussels from 1866 until 1867

References

French male ballet dancers
French ballet masters
Ballet choreographers
French choreographers
French ballet librettists
Entertainers from Marseille
1808 births
1868 deaths
Dance directors of La Monnaie
19th-century French ballet dancers
Paris Opera Ballet étoiles
Paris Opera Ballet artistic directors